KOBC (90.7 FM) is a radio station broadcasting a Contemporary Christian format. Licensed to Joplin, Missouri, United States, the station serves the Joplin area.

Past
KOBC was founded on February 24, 1967, by its previous owner, Ozark Christian College and operated on the 91.1 FM frequency. In 1972, the Federal Communications Commission (FCC) approved a license to increase transmitting power to 30,000 watts and change the frequency to 90.7 FM. Transmission power was raised again in 1998 to 60,000 watts, effectively increasing KOBC's listening area by 40%.

Sale of KOBC
OCC sold KOBC to its current owner, the Educational Media Foundation, on October 1, 2008.

Translators
In December 1987, an FM translator was added in Chanute, KS at 103.1 FM. A second translator was added for Fayetteville, AR in July 1988 at 100.1 FM, but it was disassembled after another Christian radio station began broadcasting in Fayetteville in 1996. The Chanute translator continues to operate.

References

External links

90.7 FM KOBC
Educational Media Foundation (EMF Broadcasting)
K-LOVE network
Ozark Christian College

OBC
K-Love radio stations
Radio stations established in 1967
1967 establishments in Missouri
Educational Media Foundation radio stations
Ozark Christian College
OBC